Lesbian, gay, bisexual, and transgender (LGBT) persons in  Niue face legal challenges not experienced by non-LGBT residents. Male same-sex sexual activity is illegal in Niue. Same-sex couples and households headed by same-sex couples are not eligible for the same legal protections available to opposite-sex married couples.

History
They have traditionally been accepted by Niuean society, and would play an important domestic role in communal life.

In 2007, during a gathering of delegates from around the Pacific in Mangere, New Zealand, a local  called out the discrimination and stigma faced by the  community: "Our communities were an accepted part of Pacific life and culture prior to Western colonisation, but have been subject to much stigma and discrimination in more recent times."

Laws regarding same-sex sexual activity

Criminal Law Code
Male homosexual activity is illegal in Niue. Consensual male sodomy is punishable by up to ten years' imprisonment, while indecency between males is punishable by up to five years' imprisonment.

43 Buggery
(1) Every one is liable to imprisonment for 10 years who commits buggery either with a human being or with any other living creature.
(2) This offence is complete upon penetration.
44 Attempted buggery and indecent assaults on males
(1) Every one is liable to imprisonment for 5 years who –
(a) Attempts to commit buggery; or
(b) Assaults any person with intent to commit buggery; or
(c) Being a male, indecently assaults any other male person.
(2) It is no defence to a charge of indecent assault on a male person of any age that he consented to the act of indecency.

Recognition of same-sex relationships
Same-sex unions are not recognized (even though they are in New Zealand). The Family Law Code 2007 does not expressly prohibit same-sex marriages, but generally assumes the parties to be of the opposite sex. The law forbids marriages within the degrees of consanguinity and marriages where the wife is less than 15 years of age and the husband less than 18 years of age, but makes no mention of same-sex partners. Marriages are recorded by the Registrar of the High Court, or any minister of religion or other person who has been appointed as a marriage officer.

Living conditions
Much like the rest of Polynesia, open displays of affection between partners regardless of sexual orientation may offend.

Summary table

See also

Human rights in Niue
LGBT rights in New Zealand
LGBT rights in Oceania

References

 
Politics of Niue
Law of Niue